Royal Air Force Longtown or more simply RAF Longtown is a former Royal Air Force station located  east of Longtown, Cumbria and  northeast of Carlisle, Cumbria, England.

History

The following units were posted here at some point:
 No. 1 (Coastal) Engine Control Demonstration Unit RAF.
 No. 6 (Coastal) Operational Training Unit RAF.
 No. 9 (Coastal) Operational Training Unit RAF.
 No. 41 Squadron RAF between 1 August and 11 August 1942 with Supermarine Spitfire Mk VB's.
 No. 55 Operational Training Unit RAF.
 No. 59 Operational Training Unit RAF.
 No. 1332 (Transport) Heavy Conversion Unit RAF.
 No. 1521 (Radio Aids Training) Flight RAF.
 No. 1674 Heavy Conversion Unit RAF.

Current use

The site is currently farmland.

References

Citations

Bibliography

Royal Air Force stations in Cumbria